The Paleozoic (or Palaeozoic) Era is the earliest of three geologic eras of the Phanerozoic Eon.
The name Paleozoic was coined by the British geologist Adam Sedgwick in 1838
by combining the Greek words palaiós ("old") and zōḗ, "life", meaning "ancient life").

 Cambrian
 Ordovician
 Silurian
 Devonian
 Carboniferous
 Permian

The Paleozoic comes after the Neoproterozoic Era of the Proterozoic Eon and is followed by the Mesozoic Era.

The Paleozoic was a time of dramatic geological, climatic, and evolutionary change. The Cambrian witnessed the most rapid and widespread diversification of life in Earth's history, known as the Cambrian explosion, in which most modern phyla first appeared. Arthropods, molluscs, fish, amphibians, reptiles, and synapsids all evolved during the Paleozoic. Life began in the ocean but eventually transitioned onto land, and by the late Paleozoic, great forests of primitive plants covered the continents, many of which formed the coal beds of Europe and eastern North America. Towards the end of the era, large, sophisticated synapsids and diapsids were dominant and the first modern plants (conifers) appeared.

The Paleozoic Era ended with the largest extinction event of the Phanerozoic Eon, the Permian–Triassic extinction event. The effects of this catastrophe were so devastating that it took life on land 30 million years into the Mesozoic Era to recover.
Recovery of life in the sea may have been much faster.

Geology
The beginning of the Paleozoic Era witnessed the breakup of the supercontinent of Pannotia
and ended while the supercontinent Pangaea was assembling.
The breakup of Pannotia began with the opening of the Iapetus Ocean and other Cambrian seas and coincided with a dramatic rise in sea level.
Paleoclimatic studies and evidence of glaciers indicate that Central Africa was most likely in the polar regions during the early Paleozoic. The breakup of Pannotia was followed by the assembly of the huge continent Gondwana. By mid-Paleozoic, the collision of North America and Europe produced the Acadian-Caledonian uplifts, and a subduction plate uplifted eastern Australia. By the late Paleozoic, continental collisions formed the supercontinent of Pangaea and created great mountain chains, including the Appalachians, Ural Mountains, and mountains of Tasmania.

Periods of the Paleozoic Era
There are six periods in the Paleozoic Era: Cambrian, Ordovician, Silurian, Devonian, Carboniferous (subdivided into the Mississippian and the Pennsylvanian subperiods), and the Permian.

Cambrian Period

The Cambrian spanned from 539–485 million years ago and is the first period of the Paleozoic Era of the Phanerozoic. The Cambrian marked a boom in evolution in an event known as the Cambrian explosion in which the largest number of creatures evolved in any single period of the history of the Earth. Creatures like algae evolved, but the most ubiquitous of that period were the armored arthropods, like trilobites. Almost all marine phyla evolved in this period. During this time, the supercontinent Pannotia begins to break up, most of which later became the supercontinent Gondwana.

Ordovician Period

The Ordovician spanned from 485–444 million years ago. The Ordovician was a time in Earth's history in which many of the biological classes still prevalent today evolved, such as primitive fish, cephalopods, and coral. The most common forms of life, however, were trilobites, snails and shellfish. The first arthropods went ashore to colonize the empty continent of Gondwana. By the end of the Ordovician, Gondwana was at the south pole, early North America had collided with Europe, closing the Atlantic Ocean. Glaciation of Africa resulted in a major drop in sea level, killing off all life that had established along coastal Gondwana. Glaciation may have caused the Ordovician–Silurian extinction events, in which 60% of marine invertebrates and 25% of families became extinct, and is considered the first Phanerozoic mass extinction event, and the second deadliest.

Silurian Period

The Silurian spanned from 444–419 million years ago. The Silurian saw the rejuvenation of life as the  Earth recovered from the previous glaciation. This period saw the mass evolution of fish, as jawless fish became more numerous, jawed fish evolved, and the first freshwater fish evolved, though arthropods, such as sea scorpions, were still apex predators. Fully terrestrial life evolved, including early arachnids, fungi, and centipedes. The evolution of vascular plants (Cooksonia) allowed plants to gain a foothold on land. These early plants were the forerunners of all plant life on land. During this time, there were four continents: Gondwana (Africa, South America, Australia, Antarctica, Siberia), Laurentia (North America), Baltica (Northern Europe), and Avalonia (Western Europe). The recent rise in sea levels allowed many new species to thrive in water.

Devonian Period

The Devonian spanned from 419–359 million years ago. Also known as "The Age of the Fish", the Devonian featured a huge diversification of fish, including armored fish like Dunkleosteus and lobe-finned fish which eventually evolved into the first tetrapods. On land, plant groups diversified incredibly in an event known as the Devonian explosion when plants made lignin allowing taller growth and vascular tissue: the first trees evolved, as well as seeds. This event also diversified arthropod life, by providing them new habitats. The first amphibians also evolved, and the fish were now at the top of the food chain. Near the end of the Devonian, 70% of all species became extinct in an event known as the Late Devonian extinction, which was the Earth's second Phanerozoic mass extinction event.

Carboniferous Period

The Carboniferous spanned from 359–299 million years ago. During this time, average global temperatures were exceedingly high; the early Carboniferous averaged at about 20 degrees Celsius (but cooled to 10 °C during the Middle Carboniferous). Tropical swamps dominated the Earth, and the lignin stiffened trees grew to greater heights and number. As the bacteria and fungi capable of eating the lignin had not yet evolved, their remains were left buried, which created much of the carbon that became the coal deposits of today (hence the name "Carboniferous"). Perhaps the most important evolutionary development of the time was the evolution of amniotic eggs, which allowed amphibians to move farther inland and remain the dominant vertebrates for the duration of this period. Also, the first reptiles and synapsids evolved in the swamps. Throughout the Carboniferous, there was a cooling trend, which led to the Permo-Carboniferous glaciation or the Carboniferous Rainforest Collapse. Gondwana was glaciated as much of it was situated around the south pole.

Permian Period

The Permian spanned from 299–252 million years ago and was the last period of the Paleozoic Era. At the beginning of this period, all continents joined together to form the supercontinent Pangaea, which was encircled by one ocean called Panthalassa. The land mass was very dry during this time, with harsh seasons, as the climate of the interior of Pangaea was not regulated by large bodies of water. Diapsids and synapsids flourished in the new dry climate. Creatures such as Dimetrodon and Edaphosaurus ruled the new continent. The first conifers evolved, and dominated the terrestrial landscape. Near the end of the Permian, however, Pangaea grew drier. The interior was desert, and new taxa such as Scutosaurus and Gorgonopsids filled it. Eventually they disappeared, along with 95% of all life on Earth, in a cataclysm known as "The Great Dying", the third and most severe Phanerozoic mass extinction.

Climate

The early Cambrian climate was probably moderate at first, becoming warmer over the course of the Cambrian, as the second-greatest sustained sea level rise in the Phanerozoic got underway. However, as if to offset this trend, Gondwana moved south, so that, in Ordovician time, most of West Gondwana (Africa and South America) lay directly over the South Pole.

The early Paleozoic climate was strongly zonal, with the result that the "climate", in an abstract sense, became warmer, but the living space of most organisms of the time – the continental shelf marine environment – became steadily colder. However, Baltica (Northern Europe and Russia) and Laurentia (eastern North America and Greenland) remained in the tropical zone, while China and Australia lay in waters which were at least temperate. The early Paleozoic ended, rather abruptly, with the short, but apparently severe, late Ordovician ice age. This cold spell caused the second-greatest mass extinction of the Phanerozoic Eon. Over time, the warmer weather moved into the Paleozoic Era.

The Ordovician and Silurian were warm greenhouse periods, with the highest sea levels of the Paleozoic (200 m above today's); the warm climate was interrupted only by a  cool period, the Early Palaeozoic Icehouse, culminating in the Hirnantian glaciation,  at the end of the Ordovician.

The middle Paleozoic was a time of considerable stability. Sea levels had dropped coincident with the ice age, but slowly recovered over the course of the Silurian and Devonian. The slow merger of Baltica and Laurentia, and the northward movement of bits and pieces of Gondwana created numerous new regions of relatively warm, shallow sea floor. As plants took hold on the continental margins, oxygen levels increased and carbon dioxide dropped, although much less dramatically. The north–south temperature gradient also seems to have moderated, or metazoan life simply became hardier, or both. At any event, the far southern continental margins of Antarctica and West Gondwana became increasingly less barren. The Devonian ended with a series of turnover pulses which killed off much of middle Paleozoic vertebrate life, without noticeably reducing species diversity overall.

There are many unanswered questions about the late Paleozoic. The Mississippian (early Carboniferous Period) began with a spike in atmospheric oxygen, while carbon dioxide plummeted to new lows. This destabilized the climate and led to one, and perhaps two, ice ages during the Carboniferous. These were far more severe than the brief Late Ordovician ice age; but, this time, the effects on world biota were inconsequential. By the Cisuralian Epoch, both oxygen and carbon dioxide had recovered to more normal levels. On the other hand, the assembly of Pangaea created huge arid inland areas subject to temperature extremes. The Lopingian Epoch is associated with falling sea levels, increased carbon dioxide and general climatic deterioration, culminating in the devastation of the Permian extinction.

Flora

While macroscopic plant life appeared early in the Paleozoic Era and possibly late in the Neoproterozoic Era of the earlier eon, plants mostly remained aquatic until the Silurian Period, about 420 million years ago, when they began to transition onto dry land. Terrestrial flora reached its climax in the Carboniferous, when towering lycopsid rainforests dominated the tropical belt of Euramerica. Climate change caused the Carboniferous Rainforest Collapse which fragmented this habitat, diminishing the diversity of plant life in the late Carboniferous and Permian periods.

Fauna
A noteworthy feature of Paleozoic life is the sudden appearance of nearly all of the invertebrate animal phyla in great abundance at the beginning of the Cambrian. The first vertebrates appeared in the form of primitive fish, which greatly diversified in the Silurian and Devonian Periods. The first animals to venture onto dry land were the arthropods. Some fish had lungs, and powerful bony fins that in the late Devonian, 367.5 million years ago, allowed them to crawl onto land. The bones in their fins eventually evolved into legs and they became the first tetrapods, and began to develop lungs. Amphibians were the dominant tetrapods until the mid-Carboniferous, when climate change greatly reduced their diversity. Later, reptiles prospered and continued to increase in number and variety by the late Permian period.

See also

Footnotes

References

Further reading

External links

 60+ images of Paleozoic Foraminifera
 Paleozoic (chronostratigraphy scale)

 
Geological eras